Marin Haralambie Georgescu, sometimes known as Mehașgeorgescu (30 September 1892, Bucharest - 4 August 1932, Bucharest) was a Romanian Post-Impressionist painter; primarily of landscapes and buildings. Some sources give his year of birth as 1886, although this seems too early in light of his school attendance dates.

Biography
His father was a clerk for the Police Department. After graduating from the "" (Lyceum of Michael the Brave) in 1912, he attended the Bucharest National University of Arts. The following year, he went to Paris where he took courses in painting, sculpture and architecture at the École des Beaux-arts.

While there, he exhibited at the Salon and came under the influence of the Barbizon school, which gave him a lifelong preference for painting en plein aire.
Later, he visited Italy and Switzerland, which so impressed him that he considered remaining there.

In 1920, he gave his first showing at the Salon of the "" (Artistic Youth), which included such prominent names as Ștefan Luchian, Nicolae Vermont, Frederic Storck and Gheorghe Petrașcu. All of his canvases there were purchased by King Ferdinand I. This was followed by a successful solo exhibits in  1920, 1923 and 1926.

With the money obtained from those exhibits, he opened his own "Academy of Arts" in 1930, inspired by the work of Theodor Aman, who had helped establish the National University of Arts. Before his school became well-established, however, he died of unspecified causes at the early age of forty.

Selected works

References

Further reading
 Tudor Octavian, Pictori români uitați, Editura NOI Mediaprint, 2003

External links

ArtNet: More works by Georgescu.

1892 births
1932 deaths
20th-century Romanian painters
Post-impressionist painters
École des Beaux-Arts
Landscape painters
Artists from Bucharest